Millie's Book: As Dictated to Barbara Bush is a 1990 children's book by Barbara Bush, written as if from the perspective of Millie the English Springer Spaniel. Post-tax proceeds from book sales were donated to a literacy nonprofit organization.

The book reached number one on The New York Times Best Seller list (nonfiction) in 1990, and spent 23 weeks on Publishers Weekly hardcover bestseller list.

See also
 C. Fred's Story (1984)
 Dear Socks, Dear Buddy (1998), a children's book by Hillary Clinton

References

External links
 

1990 children's books
American children's books
Books by Barbara Bush